Robert Hammond ( 1950 – 30 May 2017) was a Ghanaian footballer.

Hammond played in the 1976 Summer Olympics qualification tournament. The Ghana team qualified but later withdrew in protest of the New Zealand national rugby union team tour of apartheid South Africa.

He played in the 1978 FIFA World Cup qualification campaign for Ghana against Guinea.

References 

1950s births
2017 deaths
Ghanaian footballers
Ghana international footballers
Association football midfielders
Accra Hearts of Oak S.C. players
Accra Great Olympics F.C. players
Ghana Premier League players